Northampton North is a constituency represented in the House of Commons of the UK Parliament since 2010 by  Michael Ellis, a Conservative. The constituency is a considered a bellwether, as it has reflected the national result at every general election since February 1974.

History
This constituency was created for the election of February 1974 when the old constituency of Northampton was split into Northampton North and Northampton South.

Since creation it has been a bellwether, electing an MP from the winning (or largest governing) party in every general election.

Boundaries

1974–1983: The County Borough of Northampton wards of Abington, Dallington, Kingsthorpe, Park, St David, and St George.

1983–2010: The Borough of Northampton wards of Abington, Boughton Green, Dallington and Kings Heath, Headlands, Kingsthorpe, Lings, Lumbertubs, Park, St Alban, St George, Thorplands, and Welford.

2010–present: The Borough of Northampton wards of Abington, Boughton Green, Eastfield, Headlands, Kingsley, Kingsthorpe, Lumbertubs, Parklands, St David, and Thorplands.

Constituency profile
The constituency has income, social housing and unemployment statistics close to the national average. There is a varied and dynamic service and engineering-centred economy typical of the East Midlands, with significant foodstuffs, clothing and consumables manufacturing and processing operations. Health inequality is high, with the life expectancy gap between the least deprived and most deprived men in Northampton reaching over a decade. According to Public Health England, the constituency is "considerably worse than [the] England average" in terms of violent crime, self harm, under 18 conception and GCSE achievement.

Members of Parliament

Elections

Elections in the 2020s

Elections in the 2010s

Elections in the 2000s

Elections in the 1990s

Elections in the 1980s

Elections in the 1970s

See also
List of parliamentary constituencies in Northamptonshire

Notes

References

Sources
Election Demon 1997–2005. English Boroughs Leicester East to Wythenshawe and Sale East

Parliamentary constituencies in Northamptonshire
Politics of Northampton
Constituencies of the Parliament of the United Kingdom established in 1974